The 2011 Paris–Nice was the 69th running of the Paris–Nice cycling stage race, often known as the Race to the Sun. It started on 6 March in Houdan and ended on 13 March in Nice and consisted of eight stages, including a time trial. It was the second race of the 2011 UCI World Tour season.

The race was won by  rider Tony Martin, after holding onto the leader's yellow jersey which came from a time trial stage win on stage six. Martin's winning margin over runner-up and fellow German Andreas Klöden – winner of the fifth stage of the race – was 36 seconds, with 's Bradley Wiggins completing the podium, 41 seconds down on Martin.

In the race's other classifications, Rein Taaramäe of  won the white jersey for the highest placed rider under the age of 25, and 's Heinrich Haussler took home the green jersey for amassing the highest number of points during stages at intermediate sprints and stage finishes.  rider Rémi Pauriol won the King of the Mountains classification, with  finishing at the head of the teams classification.

Teams competing

22 teams were invited to the 2011 Paris–Nice. The teams were:

Stages

Stage 1
6 March 2011 – Houdan to Houdan,

Stage 2
7 March 2011 – Montfort-l'Amaury to Amilly,

Stage 3
8 March 2011 – Cosne-Cours-sur-Loire to Nuits-Saint-Georges,

Stage 4
9 March 2011 – Crêches-sur-Saône to Belleville,

Stage 5
10 March 2011 – Saint-Symphorien-sur-Coise to Vernoux-en-Vivarais,

Stage 6
11 March 2011 – Rognes to Aix-en-Provence, individual time trial (ITT)

Stage 7 
12 March 2011 – Brignoles to Biot,

Stage 8
13 March 2011 – Nice to Nice,

Classification leadership progress

References

External links

Paris-Nice
Paris-Nice
Paris–Nice
Paris-Nice